In astronomy, the barycenter (or barycentre) is the center of mass of two or more bodies that orbit one another and is the point about which the bodies orbit. A barycenter is a dynamical point, not a physical object. It is an important concept in fields such as astronomy and astrophysics. The distance from a body's center of mass to the barycenter can be calculated as a two-body problem.

If one of the two orbiting bodies is much more massive than the other and the bodies are relatively close to one another, the barycenter will typically be located within the more massive object. In this case, rather than the two bodies appearing to orbit a point between them, the less massive body will appear to orbit about the more massive body, while the more massive body might be observed to wobble slightly. When the two bodies are of similar masses, the barycenter will generally be located between them and both bodies will orbit around it. This is the case for Pluto and Charon, one of Pluto's natural satellites, as well as for many binary asteroids and binary stars. When the less massive object is far away, the barycenter can be located outside the more massive object. This is the case for Jupiter and the Sun; despite the Sun being a thousandfold more massive than Jupiter, their barycenter is slightly outside the Sun due to the relatively large distance between them.

In astronomy, barycentric coordinates are non-rotating coordinates with the origin at the barycenter of two or more bodies. The International Celestial Reference System (ICRS) is a barycentric coordinate system centered on the Solar System's barycenter.

Two-body problem 

The barycenter is one of the foci of the elliptical orbit of each body. This is an important concept in the fields of astronomy and astrophysics. When the barycenter is located within the more massive body, that body will appear to "wobble" rather than to follow a discernible orbit. In a simple two-body case, the distance from the center of the primary to the barycenter, r1, is given by:

where :
r1 is the distance from body 1's center to the barycenter
a is the distance between the centers of the two bodies
m1 and m2 are the masses of the two bodies.

Primary–secondary examples 

The following table sets out some examples from the Solar System. Figures are given rounded to three significant figures. The terms "primary" and "secondary" are used to distinguish between involved participants, with the larger being the primary and the smaller being the secondary.

Inside or outside the Sun? 

If —which is true for the Sun and any planet—then the ratio  approximates to:

Hence, the barycenter of the Sun–planet system will lie outside the Sun only if:

—that is, where the planet is massive and far from the Sun.

If Jupiter had Mercury's orbit, the Sun–Jupiter barycenter would be approximately 55,000 km from the center of the Sun. But even if the Earth had Eris's orbit, the Sun–Earth barycenter would still be within the Sun (just over 30,000 km from the center).

To calculate the actual motion of the Sun, only the motions of the four giant planets (Jupiter, Saturn, Uranus, Neptune) need to be considered. The contributions of all other planets, dwarf planets, etc. are negligible. If the four giant planets were on a straight line on the same side of the Sun, the combined center of mass would lie at about 1.17 solar radii, or just over 810,000 km above the Sun's surface.

The calculations above are based on the mean distance between the bodies and yield the mean value r1. But all celestial orbits are elliptical, and the distance between the bodies varies between the apses, depending on the eccentricity, e. Hence, the position of the barycenter varies too, and it is possible in some systems for the barycenter to be sometimes inside and sometimes outside the more massive body. This occurs where

The Sun–Jupiter system, with eJupiter = 0.0484, just fails to qualify: .

Gallery 
Images are representative (made by hand), not simulated.

Relativistic corrections 

In classical mechanics (Newtonian gravitation), this definition simplifies calculations and introduces no known problems. In general relativity (Einsteinian gravitation), complications arise because, while it is possible, within reasonable approximations, to define the barycenter, we find that the associated coordinate system does not fully reflect the inequality of clock rates at different locations. Brumberg explains how to set up barycentric coordinates in general relativity.

The coordinate systems involve a world-time, i.e. a global time coordinate that could be set up by telemetry. Individual clocks of similar construction will not agree with this standard, because they are subject to differing gravitational potentials or move at various velocities, so the world-time must be synchronized with some ideal clock that is assumed to be very far from the whole self-gravitating system. This time standard is called Barycentric Coordinate Time (TCB, sic).

Selected barycentric orbital elements 

Barycentric osculating orbital elements for some objects in the Solar System are as follows:

For objects at such high eccentricity, barycentric coordinates are more stable than heliocentric coordinates for a given epoch because the barycentric osculating orbit is not as greatly affected by where Jupiter is on its 11.8 year orbit.

See also 

 Barycentric Dynamical Time
 Centers of gravity in non-uniform fields
 Center of mass
 Center of mass (relativistic)
 Lagrangian point
 Mass point geometry
 Roll center
 Weight distribution

References 
 

Astronomical coordinate systems
Celestial mechanics
Mass
Geometric centers